The Office of Civil Defense (OCD) was an agency of the United States Department of Defense from 1961–64. It replaced the Office of Civil and Defense Mobilization. The organization was renamed the Defense Civil Preparedness Agency on May 5, 1972, and was abolished on July 20, 1979, pursuant to Executive Order 12148. Its duties were given to the Federal Emergency Management Agency (FEMA).

Regions
The Office of Civil Defense was organized into several regions, in order to better manage the distribution of funds, coordination of local training and resources and support state and local agencies planning and perpetration. In May 1962 there were eight regions that.

Directors of the Office of Civil Defense
Steuart Pittman, September 15, 1961 – April 7, 1964
William Durkee, April 7, 1964 – January 1, 1967
Joseph Romm, January 1, 1967 – January 20, 1969 
John Davis, May 20, 1969 – January 20, 1977
Bardyl Tirana, April 13, 1977 – July 20, 1979

Office of Civilian Defense
The Office of Civilian Defense (OCD) was established by President Franklin D. Roosevelt in May 1941. It was responsible for planning community health programs and medical care of civilians in the event of a military attack on the United States. It was an independent agency and not associated with the United States Department of War. It coordinated with the Chemical Corps of the Department of the Army regarding protective measures against chemical weapons.  United States Public Health Service officers were assigned as medical consultants with OCD local district offices. Later in 1941, right-wing Senators added an amendment to forbid OCD from supporting physical fitness instruction “By dancers, fan dancing, street shows, theatrical performances, or other public entertainment.”

See also
 Emergency Broadcast System
 Civil defense Geiger counters
 Civil Defense Sirens in the United States

References

External links 
 Records of the Defense Civil Preparedness Agency. Accessed August 2, 2007
 
 

Government agencies established in 1961
1979 disestablishments in the United States
Defunct agencies of the United States government
Civil Defense